Ramesh Balakrishnan is an Indian film director and television producer who has worked on Tamil films and serials.

Career
Ramesh Balakrishnan graduated with an English literature degree, before going on to take a film making course at the Film and Television Institute of Chennai. He began his directorial career with the film Adharmam (1994) featuring Murali and Ranjitha in the lead roles, where cinematographer V. Manikandan also made his debut. His second film Pagaivan (1997) starring Ajith Kumar and Sathyaraj released three years later, with the makers experiencing delays after they fell out with the lead actress Anjala Zhaveri. He then went on to make the action drama Thadayam (1997), and took a break before making the horror film Adhu (2004), which starred Sneha in the lead role.

Moving away from feature films, he worked for UTV Mumbai and then helped launch the Mahabharatham television series on Sun TV. He then briefly headed UTV's Chennai office, before starting his own production house, Crank Mediaworks. The studio has since gone to make serials including Malli, Agni Paarvai featuring Simran and Vijay Chithiram.

Filmography

References

Indian television directors
Tamil film directors
Living people
20th-century Indian film directors
Year of birth missing (living people)